The 2019 Georgetown Hoyas football team represents Georgetown University as a member of the Patriot League during the 2019 NCAA Division I FCS football season. They are led by sixth-year head coach Rob Sgarlata and play their home games at Cooper Field. Georgetown finished the season 5–6 overall and 1–5 in Patriot League play to place last out of seven teams.

Previous season
The Hoyas finished the 2018 season 5–6, 4–2 in Patriot League play to finish in a tie for second place.

Preseason

Preseason coaches' poll
The Patriot League released their preseason coaches' poll on July 30, 2019 (voting was by conference head coaches and sports information directors). The Hoyas were picked to finish in third place.

Preseason All-Patriot League team
The Hoyas had seven players selected to the preseason All-Patriot League team.

Offense

Isaac Schley – FB

Michael Dereus – WR

Defense

Duval Paul – DL

Khristian Tate – DL

Wes Bowers – LB

Ahmad Wilson – DB

Special teams

Ahmad Wilson – ATH

Schedule

Game summaries

at Davidson

Marist

Catholic University

at Columbia

at Cornell

Fordham

Lafayette

at Lehigh

Colgate

at Bucknell

at Holy Cross

References

Georgetown
Georgetown Hoyas football seasons
Georgetown Hoyas football